Aubrey Beavers (born August 30, 1971) is a former linebacker in the National Football League. He played two seasons for the Miami Dolphins and one for the New York Jets. He played college football at the University of Oklahoma.  Beavers has a daughter, Ashley Beavers, and two sons, Aubrey Jr. and Quenton Beavers. Beavers attended Jack Yates Senior High School in Houston, Texas.

Professional football statistics

References

1971 births
Living people
American football linebackers
Oklahoma Sooners football players
Miami Dolphins players
New York Jets players
Rhein Fire players
Players of American football from Houston